Hantai may refer to:

Hantai District, Hanzhong, China
Hantai, Hebei, town in and subdivision of Xinle, Hebei, China 
Pierre Hantaï (born 1964), French conductor and harpsichordist
Simon Hantaï (1922–2008), painter generally associated with abstract art